Marilyn Jane Ziffrin (August 7, 1926 - March 16, 2018) was an American composer and music educator.

Biography
Marilyn Ziffrin was born in Moline, Illinois, to parents Betty S. and Harry B. Ziffrin, (both children of Russian immigrants who emigrated from Belogorodka, Ukraine. Harry, who grew up in the then Tri Cities, of Rock Island & Moline, IL, and Davenport, Iowa, and Betty, who grew up in St. Louis, were first cousins; their fathers were brothers, and they both were first cousins of Lester Ziffren, the famous journalist, and Paul Ziffren, the Democratic Party leader from Los Angeles.  Ziffrin, a graduate of Moline, IL public schools, where her father owned a liquor distributorship,  began studying piano at age four with Louise Cervin who had studied with Theodor Leschetizky. Ziffrin also studied clarinet and saxophone and soon began composing with a piano piece called "Ode to a Lost Pencil."

Ziffrin graduated from the University of Wisconsin in Madison in 1948, and received a Master of Arts degree from Columbia University in 1949. From 1967 to 1982 she worked as an associate professor at New England College, and she taught private composition lessons at St. Paul's School in Concord, New Hampshire.

Ziffrin was a member of the National Association of Composers and Conductors. She received awards, including ASCAP Awards and Honorable Mention in the Music Teachers National Association Shepherd Competition in 1998. She was named New Hampshire Music Teachers Association Composer of the year in 1997, and has received six residencies at the MacDowell Colony.

She was also the author of Carl Ruggles: Composer, Painter, and Storyteller (Urbana: University of Illinois Press, 1994).

Selected works
Ziffrin had written compositions for solo instruments, chamber music, choral works, works for orchestra and band.

 Cantata for Freedom
 For Love of Cynthia
 Two Songs for bass-baritone
 Piano Sonata
 Fantasy for 2 pianos
 New England Epitaphs
 Music for handbells and organ
 Two Holiday Songs
 Yankee Hooray
 Concerto for viola and woodwind quintet (1977–1978)
 Haiku, Song Cycle for soprano, viola and harpsichord (or piano) (1971); words by Kathryn Martin
 Sonata for Organ and Cello (1973); Commissioned by Colby-Sawyer College for Harriette Slack Richardson
 Tributum for clarinet, viola and double bass (1992)

References

External links
 Interview with Marilyn J. Ziffrin, June 30, 1994

1926 births
2018 deaths
20th-century classical composers
American music educators
American women music educators
American women classical composers
American classical composers
American people of Russian descent
University of Wisconsin–Madison alumni
New England College alumni
MacDowell Colony fellows
20th-century American women musicians
20th-century American composers
20th-century women composers
21st-century American women
People from Moline, Illinois